"Here There Be Tygers" is a short horror story by Stephen King. It was originally published in the Spring 1968 issue of Ubris magazine, and collected in King's Skeleton Crew in 1985. This story is extremely short, and written from the perspective of a boy who believes a tiger is lurking in his school bathroom.

The title references the phrases used by medieval cartographers when they put warnings on unexplored portions of their maps.  The phrase was also used in King's later story "The Reploids." In the film version of King's novel The Dark Half, the story Thad's mother looks at is a copy of this story.

As Stephen King noted in the foreword to Skeleton Crew, this is one of the first stories King ever wrote. It was written when King was a high school student.

Plot 
Charles is a third grader. He needs to use the bathroom in the school's basement, and his teacher Miss Bird humiliates him by addressing his need in front of the class. ("Very well Charles. You may go to the bathroom and urinate. Is that what you need to do? Urinate?") Arriving at the lavatory, he peeks around the corner and sees a tiger lying on the bathroom floor. He stands at the door, too afraid to enter. Eventually, a child named Kenny Griffen comes to get him. Charles begins to cry and Kenny leads him in to the bathroom, reassuring him that he imagined the tiger. Kenny goes around the corner and disappears. Charles escapes from the bathroom, and when he forces himself to go back in, he sees the tiger has a torn piece of Kenny's shirt on its claw, and notes that the air smells of blood. Charles, seeing no other option, relieves himself in the sink, but Miss Bird catches him. She goes around the corner to find Kenny, and Charles leaves the bathroom and returns to class, leaving Miss Bird with the tiger.

See also
 Stephen King short fiction bibliography
 Here There Be Tygers by Ray Bradbury

References 

1968 short stories
Horror short stories
Tigers in literature
Short stories by Stephen King
Works originally published in Ubris